The Immediate Geographic Region of Uberaba is one of the 4 immediate geographic regions in the Intermediate Geographic Region of Uberaba, one of the 70 immediate geographic regions in the Brazilian state of Minas Gerais and one of the 509 of Brazil, created by the National Institute of Geography and Statistics (IBGE) in 2017.

It is composed of 10 municipalities with a population of 458.608 people (2021) within an area of 14.281,652 km² (5514,17 sq mi).

Municipalities 
 Água Comprida
 Campo Florido
 Conceição das Alagoas
 Conquista
 Delta
 Nova Ponte
 Sacramento
 Santa Juliana
 Uberaba
 Veríssimo

See also 

 List of Intermediate and Immediate Geographic Regions of Minas Gerais

References 

Geography of Minas Gerais